Major Isidoro is a municipality located in the center of the Brazilian state of Alagoas. Its population is 19,864 (2020) and its area is 454 km².

References

Municipalities in Alagoas